Born to Sing: No Plan B is the 34th studio album recorded by Northern Irish singer/songwriter Van Morrison, released by Blue Note Records on 2 October 2012. His first studio album of original songs since 2008's Keep It Simple, it was well received by critics with most reviewers giving it four out of five stars, including Allmusic and Rolling Stone. It debuted at No. 10 on the Billboard 200. It was Morrison's first album since the merger of EMI and Universal Music Group, which consolidated ownership of all his albums from 1984 onward.

Recording
Recorded in his hometown of Belfast, the album was described as containing ten new original songs although "Close Enough for Jazz" had featured as an instrumental on his 1993 release Too Long in Exile. The album was recorded live at the studio and features a six piece band of musicians, with Morrison on vocals, piano, guitar and alto-saxophone.

Composition
One of the album's themes and some of the songs reflect on the current worldwide financial crisis. Morrison has spoken out that he felt the need to comment on what he perceives as "the worldwide preoccupation with money, materialism, income equality, and the greed that has poisoned society" while further remarking: "I’m not proselytizing, it’s not some kind of manifesto.  Songs are just ideas, concepts, and you just put the mic there and go."

Single
Single "Open the Door (To Your Heart)" was released by EMI on 24 September 2012. It featured as the Record of the Week on BBC Radio 2 during the week commencing 25 August 2012.

The Daily Nebraskan described the song as beginning "the album with a jaunty rhythm of bass, oscillating tones of an organ and an electric guitar accentuating the off-beats. The tempo is much slower but for those fans more intimately familiar with Morrison’s catalog of songs, it feels oddly similar to "Wild Night", which appeared on his 1971 album "Tupelo Honey". Casting off the wildness of youth, this easy-paced speed more fully exposes the intricate dialog between the instruments; not only on this song but throughout the album."

Pre-release
Blue Note's president Don Was, who oversaw the release, argued that the album features "great, really incisive songwriting. It's a cool record." Was commented that the label was "incredibly honored" to have been chosen by Morrison, referring to him as "one of the greatest singer/songwriter/musicians of all time". In an interview with John Bennett in the Belfast Telegraph, Morrison described his meaning of the title as: "Well it’s all about doing what you’re meant to do and no frills, like Mose Allison said about me, if you want to look it up, 'There's no smoke or mirrors, there’s no lights. It is what you get.' That’s basically what you get. I’m not a tap dancing act. It’s just singing."

Critical reception

David Fricke hailed the album as a "vividly irritated, vocally compelling record", with Morrison "surrounded by jive and crooks, with nothing to fall back on but his sinuous growl – like gravel rolling through velvet – and scatting hallelujahs." Allmusic found that, "Employing his trademark Celtic soul, the album also showcases incursions into jazz and blues and sometimes all three within the same tune." Jazzwise critic Stephen Graham noted that the album was "recorded unusually in his home town of Belfast", and judged that "Morrison has come up with the goods once again". A preview for the same publication found that "initial listens suggest it’s his strongest album for some time", with Morrison "emphatically moving back into jazz territory", delivering "a wonderfully laconic, live-in-the-studio atmosphere". The Belfast Telegraph called it "effortless, cool and classy", adding that "when Plan A is this good, there's no reason to look any further".

Writing in The Guardian, Dave Simpson considered the album to be Morrison's "jazziest: the warm brass and catchy, sweet melodies recall 1970's Moondance. But the music's velvet glove delivers some of his hardest-hitting lyrics." The Observer found that "Morrison's voice remains peerless. A keeper, a goodie." MusicOMH praised the band as being "particularly wonderful, with a muted trumpet and double bass making for memorable solos." It concluded that "it's yet another example of his sometimes erratic genius." The Independent's Andy Gill hailed it as "Van Morrison's best album in some while" with "a set of songs that, despite the relaxed tone of their jazz-blues settings, foam with indignation about the venality of capitalist adventurism." The New Zealand Herald welcomed "[another] worthwhile late-career high from Van".

"His voice remains in sturdy form, all rumble and husk, and his once sinuous cadence feels wizened, not weakened, by the occasional arthritic crick", The A.V. Club noted. Giving it album a C+ rating, it criticised its "cynical" tone and "exhausted R&B", but conceded that it was salvaged by "solid, serviceable, latter-day Morrison material." Uncut reviewer Graeme Thomson concluded that the album "remains a vibrant and timely reaffirmation of Morrison’s talents." While not transcendent, "it contains several hints that such greatness may, finally, be within his grasp once more." Tony Clayton wrote in The Irish Times that "lyrically he ruminates on financial crises and (once again) the pressures of being Van the Man, musically it’s all jazzy breezes (Going Down to Monte Carlo) and leisurely blues (Pagan Heart)." Brandon Stewart with 612 ABC Brisbane praised the warm sound as being "immediately familiar, as Van and his road band swing through the freshest set of songs we’ve heard from Morrison in some years." Colm O'Hare of Hot Press found the album to be "chock-full of that newfound energy, lyrically and musically" harking back "to his '70s heyday". "With superb accompaniment from a stellar band, the performances and arrangements on Born To Sing: Plan B are close to perfection", he concluded.

Track listing

Personnel
Music
 Van Morrison – alto saxophone, electric guitar, piano, vocals
 Dave Keary – electric and acoustic guitar, slide guitar
 Paul Moore – bass. double bass 
 Paul Moran – Hammond organ, piano, keyboards, trumpet
 Alistair White  – trombone
 Christopher White – tenor saxophone, clarinet
 Jeff Lardner – drums, percussion
Production
 Van Morrison – production for Exile Productions, Ltd.
 Enda Walsh – recording, mixing
 Tim Young – mastered at Metropolis Mastering, London, UK
 John Rogers -  management
 Paddy Johnston -  personal assistant

Chart performance

References

Van Morrison albums
2012 albums
Blue Note Records albums
Albums produced by Van Morrison